Jean-Marie Zemb (14 July 1928 – 15 February 2007) was a French linguist.

1928 births
2007 deaths
Academic staff of the Collège de France
Linguists from France
20th-century linguists